St Mary Immaculate Catholic Primary is a Catholic school in Warwick, England for children aged 4–11. It has an on-site pre-school for children from age 2 years 9 months. The school was rated as "Good" by Ofsted in 2015 and 2019.

Ofsted Inspection – March 2019 
During its March 2019 Ofsted inspection, the school maintained its "GOOD" rating in all areas.
The Ofsted report advises that:
 "The leadership team has maintained the good quality of education in the school since the last inspection."
 "Parents and carers say that teachers always ‘go the extra mile’ to make sure that pupils are well taught and enjoy themselves."
 "Pupils benefit from a rich curriculum, including outdoor learning, music and sport."
 "You have a team of very committed governors who have a range of expertise and skills."
 "Pupils’ behaviour, their attitudes to learning and their spiritual, moral, social and cultural development are also clear strengths of the school."
 "Pupils are confident, articulate and enthusiastic learners. They are focused and attentive in lessons and their conduct around school is good."

The full inspection report can be viewed on the Ofsted website.

History

The Beginning 

On 8 May 1905 St Mary Immaculate Catholic School, West Street opened its doors for the first time under the headship of Miss Cecilia McDonnell. It was a large room with a partition across the middle.

Second World War 

In 1938 the school was becoming overcrowded. An inspector visited and noticed that children were finding it hard to concentrate, possibly due to the lack of space; 74 occupied a classroom built for 60 children.

It was around this time that the children began to use the swimming baths at St. Nicholas’ Park

The School's air raid shelters were built on the grounds of nearby Warwick Castle which could be accessed through a door in the school wall. There were two; one for infants (5–7) and juniors (8–11) and another for seniors (11–14). Both were equipped with two chemical toilets and three hurricane lamps.

Luckily, the shelters were only ever used for practice.

The 1960s: An overcrowded school 

By the time Mr. Tony Melton arrived in 1963, there were 120 pupils. When he left in 1967, the number had swollen to 200. He remembered his time at St. Mary Immaculate as the happiest of his career.

The infant teacher had 63 children in her class and one of Mr. Melton's first actions as headmaster was to appoint another teacher for that group. By 1967 the school had six classes; three in the main building, one in a black and white building up the hill from the school, one in a portable building beside the presbytery and another in a portable building in the playground. Each class had around 35–40 pupils.

In 1969, the local MP raised the problem of overcrowding in parliament. The results led to the building of a new school.

Priory pools 

Work began on a new building in Priory pools in 1971. In April 1972 the juniors moved into the new school, with the infants joining them in the February of the following year. The newer, larger grounds allowed for a swimming pool to be built. This was finished in 1974.

Easter flood 

On Maundy Thursday, 9 April 1998 it began to rain. One month's rain fell in just twelve hours. All rivers were put on red alert. The following day, the river Leam burst its banks. The school was badly damaged and the pupils attended other schools whilst repairs were carried out.

Centenary Celebrations 

In 2005, under the headship of Robert Gargan, St Mary Immaculate Catholic Primary School celebrated its Centenary. There were concerts, a Celebration Mass and the publication of the history of the school. A conservation garden was built on the site of the former swimming pool which had fallen into disuse.

Further reading 

 A Brief History of St Mary Immaculate School (2006), Edited by Helen Wild Includes text from previous history with further contributions.

Notes

External links 
 School website
 Parish website

Primary schools in Warwickshire
Catholic primary schools in the Archdiocese of Birmingham
Educational institutions established in 1905
1905 establishments in England
Voluntary aided schools in England